Robert "Bob" Mactier, VC (17 May 1890 – 1 September 1918) was an Australian recipient of the Victoria Cross, the highest award for gallantry in the face of the enemy that can be awarded to British and Commonwealth forces. He was one of 64 Australians to receive the award for their actions during the First World War, receiving it as a result of deeds performed during the Battle of Mont St Quentin on 1 September 1918. That day, Mactier was a battalion runner serving with the 23rd Battalion, Australian Imperial Force. He was sent forward by an officer to determine the cause of a delay in the battalion moving into its jumping off position. The cause was a well placed enemy machine gun. On his own initiative, Mactier jumped out of the trench and charged the gun, killing its crew of six. He then charged two other machine guns, killing more crews and causing at least 40 enemy to surrender. He was killed by fire from a fourth machine gun, but not before enabling his battalion to form up on time.

Early life
Robert Mactier was born at Tatura, Victoria, on 17 May 1890, the seventh of ten children of Robert and Christina Mactier of "Reitcam" ("Mactier" spelt backwards), a nearby property. In his formative years, he was a keen sportsman. He went to school locally, and later worked on his father's properties until he enlisted in the Australian Imperial Force at Seymour on 1 March 1917. He sailed from Melbourne with the other 151 Victorians of the 23rd Battalion's 19th Reinforcements aboard HMAT A11 Ascanius  on 11 May. He arrived in France on 14 November, and joined the battalion on 23 November. Posted to B Company, he fought in all of the battalion's subsequent battles until his death, including at Hamel, the August Offensive and Albert, where he was gassed. His brother, David, served with the 37th Battalion.

Victoria Cross action
He was 28 years old, and a private in the 23rd Battalion when the following deed took place for which he was posthumously awarded the Victoria Cross. The full citation for the Victoria Cross appeared in a supplement to the London Gazette on 13 December 1918:

Mactier was buried nearby at Clery but in 1924, he was reinterred in the Hem Farm Military Cemetery near Péronne, France. Mactier's actions have been described as "a remarkable one-man offensive". He was unmarried.

Legacy

Mactier has been commemorated in numerous ways. In his home town of Tatura there is a stained glass window in St Andrews Church dedicated to the memory of Mactier and his parents. The Robert Mactier VC Memorial Garden, commonly known as Mactier Park, is also named after him. In 1956, his two sisters represented him at the Victoria Cross centenary in London. The soldiers' club at Simpson Barracks, Watsonia was later named the "Mactier VC Club" in his honour. It also holds a bust of him by Wallace Anderson. Mactier's Victoria Cross was presented to the Australian War Memorial, in Canberra by his family in 1983, where it is now on display. His name is recorded on panel 99 of the Roll of Honour in the Commemorative Area at the Australian War Memorial.

Notes

References

External links
MACTIER R.
Private R. Mactier (photo, brief details)

1890 births
1918 deaths
Military personnel from Victoria (Australia)
Australian World War I recipients of the Victoria Cross
Australian Army soldiers
Australian military personnel killed in World War I
People from Shepparton